Yannick Kocon (born 20 August 1986) is a French former pair skater. Competing for Italy with Nicole Della Monica, he won four international medals and the Italian national title twice (2009–10). The pair placed sixth at the 2009 and 2010 European Championships and 12th at the 2010 Winter Olympics.

Career 
Kocon competed for France as a single skater on the junior level. He started pair skating in 2007 when he teamed up with Nicole Della Monica, who was also a single skater until then. They represented Italy at the 2010 Winter Olympics. Their partnership ended in January 2011 — Della Monica had a chronic inflammation in her left knee and her recovery time was uncertain.

In 2012, Kocon trained with Lubov Iliushechkina.

Programs

With Della Monica

Singles career

Competitive highlights 
GP: Grand Prix; JGP: Junior Grand Prix

Pairs career with Della Monica for Italy

Singles career for France

References

External links 

 
 

1986 births
Living people
People from Évry, Essonne
Italian male pair skaters
French male single skaters
Italian people of French descent
Figure skaters at the 2010 Winter Olympics
Olympic figure skaters of Italy
Sportspeople from Essonne